Eivin One Pedersen (8 September 1956 – 22 February 2012) was a Norwegian jazz musician (accordion and piano) from Stavanger, Norway.

Career 
One Pedersen played in the trio Detail, together with Frode Gjerstad (saxophone) and John Stevens (drums) from 1981, and released several albums on the free jazz company Circulasione Totale. Here he also published his own debut album Solo mio! (1981). In 1984 he released the album I 1984 utga han platen Keep Nose in Front, with his former group, Aha! The band name created confusion when another famous pop trio debuting with the same name almost at the same time. Later they changed the name to Extended Noise in 1986 and released several albums. Another project was the band Calling Signals, where he collaborated with Paal Nilssen-Love (drums), Frode Gjerstad (saxophone) and Nick Stephens (bass).

One Pedersen played with Terje Isungset on his performance at Vossajazz 2003. He released a duo album with Katja Medbøe, Ett bein på jorda, ett i himmelen – helt korrekt (1992), with poems by Rolf Jacobsen, and performed with Erik Balke (1996). More recently, he played on the debut album Heaveny attack (2004) by Randi Tytingvåg, as well as Villhund (2006) by Elin Furubotn.

Otherwise, he has been a member of the expert jury for Melodi Grand Prix 1979, lead the Association Norwegian jazz musicians some time, and composed commissioned work Ein med alt for the MaiJazz 1996.

Discography

His own projects 
Solo albums
1984: Solo mio! (Loose Torque)

With A-Ha/Extended Noise
1984: Keep Nose in Front (Hot Club Records)

Duo with Katja Medbøe
1992: Ett bein på jorda, ett i himmelen. Helt korrekt (Kirkelig Kulturverksted)

With Calling Signals
1998: Calling Signals (Loose Torque)
2002: Dreams in Dreams (FMR Records)
2005: Live in the UK (FMR Records)
2009: From Cafe Oto (Loose Torque)
2011: From Cafe Sting (Loose Torque)
2011: A Winter's Tour (Loose Torque)

Collaborations 
With Ciwan Haco
1994: Dûrî (Ses)

With Morten Abel
2003: Being Everything, Knowing Nothing (Virgin, EMI Music)

With Frode Gjerstad & Kevin Norton
2006: The Walk (FMR Records)

References

External links 
Minnekonsert for Eivin One Pedersen by Leif Tore Lindø 30 April 2012 at Aftenbladet (in Norwegian)

1956 births
2012 deaths
Musicians from Sandnes
20th-century Norwegian pianists
21st-century Norwegian pianists
20th-century Norwegian accordionists
21st-century Norwegian accordionists
Norwegian jazz pianists
Norwegian jazz composers
Norwegian jazz accordionists
20th-century pianists
Extended Noise members